MV Gemini is a cruise ship operated by Miray Cruises as of 2021. She was built in 1992 by Union Navale de Levante, Valencia, Spain for Crown Cruise Line as Crown Jewel. She has also sailed under the name Cunard Crown Jewel. She also operated as SuperStar Gemini for Star Cruises from 1995 to 2008.

History

Crown Jewel was built in 1992 for Crown Cruise Line (a subsidiary of EffJohn), and which was itself the merger of Finland Steamship Company and Johnson Line. The vessel Crown Jewel/Gemini is the largest cruise ship ever built in Spain. Crown Cruise Line used the ship for cruises from the United States to Canada, Bermuda and the Caribbean. In 1993, the Cunard Line signed a deal to handle marketing, sales and reservations for Crown Cruise Line, and the vessel was renamed Cunard Crown Jewel. In 1995 the ship was sold to Star Cruises, and renamed SuperStar Gemini and placed on cruise traffic from Singapore. In February 1997 the ship suffered an engine room fire.

In September 2007 Star Cruises reported that SuperStar Gemini had been sold and left the company fleet in December 2008. Reportedly the buyer was Jewel Owner Ltd., a company in the Bahamas-based Clipper Group of Denmark, which would charter the ship to a new operator in 2009.  In 2008, the Clipper Group announced that it would rename the ship Vision Star and lease the ship to the Spanish cruise ship operator, Vision Cruises.  In March 2009, Vision Cruises ceased operations.  In early 2009, Mediterranean Classic Cruises (formerly Monarch Classic Cruises) was booking cruises in the Aegean Sea aboard Vision Star.  However, these cruises were cancelled due to the non-availability of Vision Star from Vision Cruises. Instead, SuperStar Gemini was renamed Gemini, and currently has a Spanish operator, Quail Travel Group.

After the bankruptcy of Quail in 2011 Gemini was laid up in Tilbury Docks, Essex, awaiting sale or charter.

Former cruises

SuperStar Gemini was based in Singapore and she cruised to various destinations year round in the South China Sea, Gulf of Thailand, and Straits of Malacca. Superstar Gemini embarked on a three-month voyage around the Pacific including a full circumnavigation of the Australian continent and visited various cities e.g. Melbourne, Sydney, Perth (Fremantle), Brisbane, Komodo and Bali between November 2007 and February 2008.

For her final 2008 season for Star Cruises after returning from her Australian deployment Superstar Gemini was sailing a combination of Straits of Malacca seven-day cruises and six 21-day roundtrips from Singapore via Koh Samui, Laem Chebang, Ho Chi Minh City, Da Nang, Hong Kong, Halong Bay, Nha Trang, Kota Kinabalu, and Kuching returning to Singapore.

The last cruise for Star Cruises departed Singapore for a seven-day cruise to the Straits of Malacca on 28 December 2008. SuperStar Gemini arrived at the Singapore Cruise Centre for the last time on 4 January 2009 at 8.30am after her final cruise in the Straits of Malacca. She was seen  leaving the Singapore Cruise Centre at 5.45pm for Port Klang. After that, she was refitted and delivered to her new owners.

MV Gemini had a Spanish operator, Quail Travel Group (operating under the trademark "Happy Cruises"), and since November 2010 was sailing the Caribbean, based in La Havana and including stops in Cozumel, Grand Cayman and Paradise Island. From May to October 2011 MS Gemini was scheduled to sail the Mediterranean with stops in (amongst others) Venice, Athens and Istanbul. Due to Happy Cruises ceasing operations on September 24, 2011, she had to terminate her cruise at Valencia, Spain.

After the crew went on strike in Gibraltar, Gemini was berthed on 25 October 2011, at Tilbury Docks, UK, while Ocean Pearl left Tilbury Docks on 17 April 2012. During the London 2012 Olympic and Paralympic Games MV Gemini was used as temporary accommodation to house G4S games security staff. Harboured at Albert Docks.

Gemini was chartered to Petrofac, which was to build an £800 million gas plant for French company Total. She arrived in Shetland in the second week of July 2014, and berthed at Dales Voe where she is used to accommodate around 400 oil workers completing Total's gas plant. Geminis status is under Clipper Group management; the ship is berthed at Scalloway Harbour where she accommodated Petrofac workers until 15 November 2015. In the second half of November 2015 the ship left Scalloway to the Turkish yards of Besiktas, south of Istanbul, for drydock and extensive works of maintenance and refitting to start her new life as the cruise ship Celestyal Nefeli in spring 2016. The ship was chartered to Celestyal Cruises  of Cyprus.

Recent cruises
Gemini was home-ported to the Eastern Mediterranean in mid-2016. In 2017, Gemini was chartered by FEMA to host emergency response crews responding to Hurricane Irma and Hurricane Maria in St. Thomas, U.S. Virgin Islands.

In 2018 the charter with FEMA ended and Gemini returned to Europe. From June to September 2018 the vessel was in service with the Turkish tour agency Etstur, sailing from Cesme to Turkish and Greek ports. In 2019 the cruise ship was chartered by Blue World Voyages. In the first half of 2020 the ship was laid up at Piraeus, Greece. Later in 2021 the ship was chartered for several years by Miray a Turkish travel company for operation in the Aegean Sea and Sea of Marmara.

After the catastrophic earthquake in Turkey and Syria in February 2023, the Gemini has been chartered to house the homeless from the Haray region. It is mostly the elderly, sick, pregnant and families with small children who, for now, calls the ship their home.

References

External links
 Professional photographs from shipspotting.com

Cruise ships
Ships built in Spain
1991 ships